Senator Nicholas may refer to:

Members of the United States Senate
Robert C. Nicholas (1787–1856), U.S. Senator from Louisiana from 1836 to 1841
Wilson Cary Nicholas (1761–1820), U.S. Senator from Virginia from 1799 to 1804

United States state senate members
John Nicholas (congressman) (1764–1819), New York State Senate
Phil Nicholas (born 1955), Wyoming State Senate
Robert C. Nicholas (New York politician) (1801–1854), New York State Senate

See also
Michael San Nicolas (born 1981), Senate of Guam
Senator Nichols (disambiguation)